Kempsey is a town in the Mid North Coast region of New South Wales, Australia and is the council seat for Kempsey Shire. It is located roughly 16.5 kilometres inland from the coast of the Pacific Ocean, on the Macleay Valley Way near where the Pacific Highway and the North Coast railway line cross the Macleay River. It is roughly 430 kilometres north of Sydney. As of June 2018 Kempsey had a population of 15,309 (2018).

History
At the dawn of white occupation the town lay within the area of the Djangadi people's lands. An Aboriginal presence has been attested archaeologically to go back at least 4,000 years, according to the analysis of the materials excavated at the Clybucca midden, a site which the modern-day descendants of the Djangadi and Gumbaynggirr claim  native title rights. In the Clybucca area are ancient camp sites with shell beds in the form of mounds which are up to 2 metres (6 ft 7 in) high. Middens are attested in the Macleay Valley, together with remnants of a fish trap in the Limeburners Creek Nature Reserve and, just slightly north of Crescent Head, at Richardsons Crossing, there is a bora ring.

White intrusion on the Djangadi lands first took off as mostly ex-convict cedar cutters, based at a camp at Euroka Creek established by Captain A. C. Innes in 1827, began exploring the rich resources of the area in the late 1820s. The first European settler in the Kempsey district was named Enoch William Rudder, in 1835, who had purchased a land grant of 802 acres (325 ha) from its first owner, Samuel Onions.In 1836, runs held by squatters lying outside the sphere of colonial jurisdiction were absorbed into the southern legal framework.  Within a decade the timber cutters had virtually harvested every stand of this highly prized red gold timber in clearances that made the land increasingly attractive to pastoralists,[20] who by 1847, after the passage of the Imperial Waste Lands Act of the preceding year, and the implementation of the Orders-in-Council (1847) had established 31 stations along the Macleay river from Kempsey inland to Kunderang Brook. This coincided with one of the most violent and sustained examples of warfare in the Macleay gorges, during which it is estimated that around 15 massacres took place in the region targeting Aboriginal people of the area.

The Djangadi and other tribes affected adopted guerilla tactics to fight the usurpation of their land, by attacking shepherds, hit-and-run raids on homesteads and duffing sheep and cattle livestock before retreating into the gorges where pursuit was difficult. Some 2 to 3 dozen people were killed for rustling sheep at a massacre which took place at Kunderang Brook in 1840. The war ended with the establishment of a force of native police at Nulla Nulla in 1851. However, by that time, attrition had devastated tribal numbers. Of the 4,000 Aboriginal people in the area before the settlements, one third are thought to have been killed in a little over two decades.

A description of the Djangadi and other Aboriginal groups in the Macleay area was given by Captain John Macdonald Henderson in 1851.

Some Djangadi settled the Shark, Pelican Island and the two Fattorini Islands in the Macleay River, gazette as Aboriginal reserves in 1885, and grew corn there. In 1924 the Fattorini island residents were relocated to Pelican Island, and its status as a reservation was cancelled. Eventually the Djangadi moved to Kinchela Creek Station though an unofficial camp remained at Green Hills, resisting attempts to have them relocated, until they were placed under the administration of a white manager at Burnt Bridge Reserve. Discrimination barriers were finally broken in part when the first Aboriginal children were permitted in 1947 to attend Green Hill Public School, though the white community reacted by shifting their children to West Kempsey. In the 1967 referendum on whether Indigenous people should be counted in the census of the Australian population, Kempsey had the highest number of 'no' votes in the country.

European settlement

Enoch William Rudder is credited with founding the settlement. He arrived from Birmingham in 1834 and bought land on the southern bank of the river in 1836, at what was then the limit of authorized settlement (the boundary of County Macquarie).  He was initially attracted by red cedar cutting opportunities but planned also to profit by selling parts of his land. He had riverside blocks surveyed and established a private town, with the first blocks sold in November 1836.  He called it Kempsey because the surrounding areas reminded him of the Kempsey Valley in Worcestershire.  The collapse in red cedar prices in the early 1840s nearly led to the failure of the town.

The main (and most flood-prone) part of Kempsey was founded by John Verge, sub-dividing a grant on the flood-plain opposite Rudder's settlement. 1854, a government town was surveyed at West Kempsey and government facilities moved there when it became clear that no town would form around the police station and courthouse at Belgrave Falls.  Rudder's settlement was renamed East Kempsey.

Kempsey initially flourished as a center for logging and sawmilling. Large reserves of Australian red cedar Toona australis, (sold in Britain and the US as "Indian mahogany") were extracted down until the 1920s, and with greater difficulty until the 1960s, by which time the resource was effectively exhausted.  Dairying was the major industry in the area until the 1960s, with a Nestlé Milo factory at nearby Smithtown, and several cheese and butter factories.

Burnt Bridge
John Moseley was an Aboriginal farmer who moved to Burnt Bridge, Euroka Creek, near Kempsey, in 1892. Like the European farmers in the district, he grew maize. In 1900, Aboriginal children were excluded from Euroka Public School. Moseley, his son Percy and others petitioned for an Aboriginal school, which was created at Burnt Bridge in 1905.

Under the Aborigines Protection Act 1909, the Aborigines Protection Board (APB) became responsible for the care and control of Aboriginal people, which included powers to remove children from their families. The APB pursued a policy of taking land from Aboriginal farmers and putting it in the hands of white farmers (by sale or lease). His protests to no avail, Moseley was forced to share-farm on a property he formerly owned. In October 1925, Moseley and Jimmy Linwood addressed a meeting at Kempsey showground organised by the Aborigines Progressive Association.

Around 1930, other members of the Moseley family joined John on the farm at Euroka Creek. In 1937 the APB secured a large block next to the farm for the creation of Burnt Bridge Aboriginal Reserve (sometimes referred to as Burnt Bridge Mission). Aboriginal people from various other communities were moved there and forced to live with inadequate housing or a poor water supply.

Children were removed from the Reserve, including girls who were taken to the Cootamundra Domestic Training Home for Aboriginal Girls, and became part of the Stolen Generations.

The manager of the reserve tried to take over the Moseleys' land, but after several scuffles, stand-offs, a letter to the local press by Moseley, a visit to Sydney by one of his sons, and intervention by Michael Sawtell, the APB agreed to leave them alone. After John's death in July 1938, Percy continued to make a claim on the land; he was then threatened with expulsion.

Heritage listings 
Kempsey has a number of heritage-listed sites, including:
 Belgrave Street: Kempsey Post Office
 North Coast railway: Macleay River railway bridge
 67 Smith Street: St Andrew's Presbyterian Church and Hall

Climate

Floods
Geographically, Kempsey stretches out around a long loop of the Macleay River at the top of the flood-plain. It is famous for its floods. The 1949 flood was particularly destructive, having washed away a large part of the town centre when the railway viaduct (which was acting as a dam-wall due to a build-up of debris against the approaches to the railway bridge) gave way. The area most affected by this flood is now the site of playing fields.  The shire council has a policy of buying up land in areas designated as flood plains and many houses have been transported to higher ground in recent years. Other major floods occurred in 1949, 1950, 1963, 2001, 2009, 2013, 2021, late February to March 2022

Economy
Kempsey has a history of economic problems and disadvantage. Of the 10,374 residents in the area 1,573 worked full-time and 1,105 worked part-time. The area has an unemployment rate significantly higher than the national average. A plurality (35.1) of children live in families in which no member works. The median weekly household income is $691, nearly half the national average.

Despite a period of economic stagnation in past decades  compared to nearby coastal centres of growth, Kempsey has a growing local economy based on tourism, farming and service industries.  As a local centre it has many shops and services including three major supermarkets and fast food chain stores such as Subway, McDonald's and KFC.

In 2014, the Australian Bureau of Statistics  ranked Kempsey as one of the poorest Local Government areas in New South Wales.

A Coles supermarket development (known as the "Kempsey Central Shopping Centre") has been built and is situated where the Tattersalls Hotel and various small businesses were in Little Belgrave Street. This shopping centre opened on 6 December 2008. Target Country closed their department store on 9 June 2018 - this ends a 33-year connection to the Macleay Valley (Fosseys was formerly in town before being rebranded as Target Country).

Growing industries include wineries and nut production. Kempsey is a service center for the nearby coastal resorts of South West Rocks, Arakoon, Hat Head, and Crescent Head, which are popular places for retirees and holiday-makers alike.

Demographics
According to the 2016 Australian Census the median age in the Kempsey area is 42. 16.7% of residents are Aboriginal or Torres Strait Islander, with the median age of that group being 23. 84.2% of people were born in Australia. compared with the national average of 66.7%. The next most common country of birth was England at 1.6%.  72.8% reported having both parents born in Australia; this is significantly higher than the national average of 47.3%. 84.9% of Kempsey residents spoke only English at home.

The most common responses for religion were Catholic 23.5%, No Religion 23.1% and Anglican 20.8%.

Sports
The most popular sport in Kempsey is Rugby league. The town has produced many NRL stars including Amos Roberts, Aiden Tolman, Albert Kelly, James Roberts and former Australian centre and Indigenous All Stars captain Greg Inglis, the latter 3 of whom are cousins. A local team, the Macleay Valley Mustangs, play in the Group 3 Rugby League competition, with their home ground being Verge St Oval. Another local team, the Lower Macleay Magpies, based in nearby Smithtown, play in the Hastings League. Kempsey have a junior team in the Group 2 Rugby League competition, the Kempsey Dragons.

Kempsey Rugby League teams:
 Macleay Valley Mustangs (Group 3 Rugby League)
 Lower Macleay Magpies (Hastings League)

Kempsey used to have an Australian rules team called the Macleay Valley Eagles, who folded in 2016.

Crime
In recent decades Kempsey has attracted attention for its high and rising rate of crime when compared with state averages. In 2016 crime figures released by the NSW Police Force revealed crime levels in Kempsey are two times the state average. Break and enter is a particular problem, with a rate three times the state average. From 2014 to 2016, most crimes increased in Kempsey, with domestic violence, robbery with a firearm and break and enters all rising.

In 2015 it was reported in the Sydney Morning Herald that Kempsey was experiencing violent crime linked to ice addiction. Offences for methamphetamine trafficking are roughly twice the state average. There followed a proactive program of crime prevention and community safety initiatives funded through the Australian, NSW and local government that has seen the town revitalised and crime incidents reduced. The 2016-17 Annual Report of Kempsey Shire Council indicated 80% of residents felt safe in their homes and public spaces.

Facilities
Government buildings such as the council chambers, library and several offices - are located west of the North Coast Railway line in West Kempsey. This area is not subject to the flooding that the CBD occasionally sees and is seen as a second business district with a variety of businesses and banking facilities.

Transport
Until a new 14.5 kilometre bypass opened on 27 March 2013, the Pacific Highway passed through Kempsey. The former alignment is now known as the Macleay Valley Way. The new bypass included a 3.2 kilometre Macleay River Bridge, the longest bridge in Australia.

Kempsey railway station is located on the North Coast line providing a connection to Sydney and Brisbane.

Education

Primary schools
 Kempsey East Public School
 Kempsey South Public School
 Kempsey West Public School
 Kempsey Adventist School
 Green Hill Public School
 St Joseph's Primary School

High schools
 Kempsey High School in West Kempsey largely servicing students living north of the Macleay.
 Melville High School in South Kempsey servicing students living south of the river and in the beachside communities.
 St Paul's College
 Kempsey Adventist School in South Kempsey servicing students all around the Macleay.
 Macleay Vocational College
 Mid North Coast Correctional Centre provides education equivalent to high school level as a means of rehabilitation and reintegration

Notable people

 Richard James Allen, Australian poet, dancer, filmmaker
 Jolene Anderson, actress and It Takes Two Series 2 winner
 Wayne Bartrim, rugby league player of the 1990s
 Joseph Donovan, Olympic boxer
 Slim Dusty (David Gordon Kirkpatrick), singer
 Charles Louis Gabriel, Medical practitioner
 Silas Gill, Methodist preacher
 Terry Giddy, Australian Paralympic athlete
 David Griffin, Paralympic swimmer & gold medallist
 Greg Inglis, rugby league player
 Albert Kelly, rugby league player
 Thomas Keneally, novelist
 Robin Klein, Australian author
 Henry Tasman Lovell, Psychologist and educator
 Amos Morris, singer
 Andy Patmore, rugby league player.
 Penelope Plummer, Miss World 1968
 Dennis Richardson, Officer of the Order of Australia, former Director-General of Security of the Australian Security Intelligence Organisation, and former Australian ambassador to the United States
 Amos Roberts, former rugby league footballer
 James Roberts, rugby league player.
 Joe Robinson, guitarist and winner of Australia's Got Talent, Season 2
 Dave Sands, Indigenous Australian boxer
 Hector Thompson, boxer of the 1970s and 1980s
 Aiden Tolman, rugby league player.
 Jack Verge, Australian rugby union player
 Amy Winters, Paralympic gold medallist

In Fiction
Tom Keneally's novel A River Town,  (1995), a mystery novel centred on the lives of an Irish settler Tim Shea and his family in the period on the eve of Federation, is set in Kempsey.

See also

References

External links
Kempsey Shire Council Homepage
Macleay Valley Coast Tourist Information Site
Macleay Valley Newspaper and Weather

 
Towns in New South Wales
Mid North Coast
1836 establishments in Australia
Populated places established in 1836
Kempsey Shire